Boozoo Bajou is a musical duo, Florian Seyberth and Peter Heider, from Germany. They are noted for their distinct blend of Cajun sounds with island rhythms. Their first album, Satta, was released in 2001. In 2005 they released Dust My Broom.  The list of Boozoo Bajou remixes for other artists includes Common, Tosca, Trüby Trio, and Tony Joe White.

Discography

Studio albums 
 Satta (2001)
 Dust My Broom (2005)
 Grains (2009)
 Coming Home (2010)
 4 (2014)
 Lambique (2021)

Compilations 
 Juke Joint (2003)
 Remixes (2003)
 Juke Joint Vol. II (2006)

Compilation appearances
1999: Glücklich III
2000: Om Lounge Volume 3
2001: Coffeeshop Volume 4
2001: Bar Lounge Classics Volume 01
2002: Bar Lounge Classics Volume 02
2003: Later - The Bee
2004: The Outernational Sound / Thievery Corporation
2004: Bar Lounge Classics Weekend Edition
2005: Impulsive! Revolutionary Jazz Reworked
2006: Brazilectro Session 8
2006: Hed Kandi - Serve Chilled
2007: The Bria Project - Poolside Affair Vol. 1
2009: Bar Lounge Classics Deluxe Edition

External links
Boozoo Bajou interview
Boozoo Bajou Official Website
Boozoo Bajou 2009 album website
One's & Two's: Boozoo Bajou at Anthem Magazine
[ At AllMusic]

German musical groups
Downtempo musicians
Dubtronica musicians